Honor Rising: Japan 2018 was a two-day professional wrestling "supershow" event co-produced by the Japanese New Japan Pro-Wrestling (NJPW) and American Ring of Honor (ROH) promotions. The shows took place on February 23 and 24, 2018, at Korakuen Hall in Tokyo, Japan.

Continuing the partnership between NJPW and ROH, these were the second annual Honor Rising: Japan shows co-produced by NJPW and ROH.

Storylines

Honor Rising: Japan 2018 featured professional wrestling matches, involving different wrestlers from pre-existing scripted feuds, plots, and storylines that played out on ROH's and NJPW's television programs. Wrestlers portrayed villains or heroes as they followed a series of events that built tension and culminated in a wrestling match or series of matches.

Results
February 23

February 24

References

External links
Honor Rising: Japan 2018 at NJPW.co.jp 

Honor Rising: Japan
2018 in professional wrestling
Events in Tokyo
Professional wrestling in Tokyo
2018 in Tokyo
February 2018 events in Japan